José Luis Oliva Meza is the former mayor (1992–1994) of Naolinco, Veracruz, Mexico, and director of the radio station [[Grupo Oliva Radio en el estado de Veracruz].

References

Year of birth missing (living people)
People from Veracruz (city)
Living people
Municipal presidents in Veracruz
Politicians from Veracruz
20th-century Mexican politicians